Feryal Demirci Clark (Demirci; born 6 January 1979) is a British Labour Party politician who has served as Member of Parliament (MP) for Enfield North since 2019.

Early life
Clark was born in Turkey to Alevi Kurdish parents with roots in Kürecik, Malatya Province. She studied Bioinformatics at the University of Exeter.

Political career
Clark was elected as a councillor for Brownswood ward in the London Borough of Hackney in 2006, representing it until 2014 when she was elected for Hoxton East & Shoreditch ward. She rose to become the Deputy Mayor of Hackney and Cabinet Member for Health, Social Care, Leisure and Parks. As a councillor she has promoted cycling in the Hackney borough.

Clark endorsed Yvette Cooper during the 2015 leadership election.

She was seventh on Labour's London-wide list for the 2016 London Assembly election, but was not elected.

In October 2019, Clark was selected as the prospective parliamentary candidate for Enfield North, replacing Joan Ryan who had defected to Change UK earlier that year. Clark was elected during the 2019 general election, becoming Labour's first ever Kurdish MP. She made her maiden speech in a Commons debate on Health and Social Care.

Clark endorsed Lisa Nandy for Leader of the Labour Party during the 2020 leadership election. She is a supporter of Labour Friends of Israel.

In the November 2021 opposition front bench reshuffle, she was appointed Shadow Minister for Primary Care and Patient Safety.

In January 2022, Clark called on UK Government to recognize the Armenian Genocide. She has said "I was born in south-east Turkey and grew up hearing stories about the horrors faced by the Armenian people in that region. Almost 100 years ago, a whole culture and a whole people were systematically destroyed and had their identity erased in an act of appalling violence. Families were torn apart, with children never seeing their parents again. Some 1.5 million Armenian men, women and children were killed. Vibrant, centuries-old communities were simply wiped off the face of the map."

References

External links

Living people
21st-century British women politicians
Alumni of the University of Exeter
British people of Kurdish descent
Councillors in the London Borough of Hackney
Female members of the Parliament of the United Kingdom for English constituencies
Kurdish Alevis
Kurdish politicians
Labour Party (UK) councillors
Labour Party (UK) MPs for English constituencies
Naturalised citizens of the United Kingdom
Turkish emigrants to the United Kingdom
UK MPs 2019–present
21st-century English women
21st-century English people
1979 births